is a common Japanese surname.

People with the surname
Akihiro Higuchi, Ukrainian-born film director known by his alias Higuchinsky
, Japanese manga artist
, Japanese voice actress
, Japanese manga artist
Dean Higuchi, American professional wrestler better known as Dean Ho
, Japanese golfer
, Japanese Meiji-era author
, Japanese actress
, Japanese samurai better known as Naoe Kanetsugu
, Japanese journalist
Keiko Sofía Fujimori Higuchi (born 1975), Peruvian politician, daughter of Alberto Fujimori and Susana Higuchi
, Japanese photographer
, Imperial Army lieutenant-general
, Japanese swimmer
Motoya Higuchi, Japanese race-car driver
, Japanese drummer for the band Loudness
, Japanese sport wrestler
, Japanese storyboard artist
, Japanese professional wrestler known as "Ikemen" Jiro Kuroshio
Susana Higuchi, Peruvian politician, wife of Alberto Fujimori and mother of Keiko Sofía Fujimori Higuchi
, Japanese manga artist
, Japanese photographer
, Japanese volleyball player
, Japanese footballer
, Japanese football player
Wakaba Higuchi (樋口新葉, born 2001), Japanese figure skater
William Higuchi (樋口 宇生利明夢), American chemist and professor
, Japanese footballer
, Japanese figure skater
, Japanese bassist for the band Buck-Tick

Fictional characters
, Pita-Ten character
, Death Note character

Others
Higuchi Station (Ibaraki)
Higuchi Station (Saitama)

Japanese-language surnames